Amharas are a Semitic-speaking ethnic group which is indigenous to Ethiopia, traditionally inhabiting parts of the northwest Highlands of Ethiopia, particularly inhabiting the Amhara Region. According to the 2007 national census, Amharas numbered 19,867,817 individuals, comprising 26.9% of Ethiopia's population, and they are mostly Oriental Orthodox Christian (members of the Ethiopian Orthodox Tewahedo Church).

They are also found within the Ethiopian expatriate community, particularly in North America. They speak Amharic, an Afro-Asiatic language of the Semitic branch which serves as the main and one of the five official languages of Ethiopia. As of 2018, Amharic has over 32 million native speakers and 25 million second language speakers.

The Amhara and neighboring groups in North and Central Ethiopia and Eritrea refer to themselves as "Habesha" (Abyssinian) people.

Origin
The earliest extants of the Amhara as a people, dates to the early 12th century in the middle of the Zagwe Dynasty, when the Amhara were recorded of being in conflict in the land of Wargih against the Wärjih in 1128 AD.

A non-contemporary 13th or 14th century hagiographical source from Saint Tekle Haymanot traces Amhara even further back to the mid 9th century AD as a location.

Ethnogenesis

Amharic is a South Ethio-Semitic language, along with Gurage, Argobba and others. Some time before the 1st century AD, the North and South branches of Ethio-Semitic diverged. Due to the social stratification of the time, the Cushitic Agaw adopted the South Ethio-Semitic language and eventually absorbed the Semitic population. Amharic thus developed with a Cushitic substratum and a Semitic superstratum. The proto-Amhara, or the northernmost South Ethio-Semitic speakers, remained in constant contact with their North Ethio-Semitic neighbors, evidenced by linguistic analysis and oral traditions. A 7th century southward shift of the center of gravity of the Kingdom of Aksum and the ensuing integration and Christianization of the proto-Amhara also resulted in a high prevalence of Geʽez sourced lexicon in Amharic. By about the 9th century AD, there was a linguistically distinct ethnic group called the Amhara in the area between the Tekezé River and the valleys of the eastern tributaries of the Blue Nile.

Etymology
The present name for the Amharic language and its speakers comes from the medieval province of Amhara. The latter enclave was located around Lake Tana at the headwaters of the Blue Nile, and included a slightly larger area than Ethiopia's present-day Amhara Region.

The further derivation of the name is debated. Popular etymology traces it to amari ("pleasing; beautiful; gracious") or mehare ("gracious"). Getachew Mekonnen Hasen traces it to an ethnic name related to the Himyarites of ancient Yemen.

History

The province of "Amhara" was historically located in the modern province of Wollo (Bete Amhara), in the feudal era, the region which is now known as Amhara was composed of several provinces which had little or no autonomy, these provinces included Dembiya, Begemder, Gojjam, Wollo, Lasta, Shewa, Semien, Angot, and Fatagar.

Evidence of a traceable Christian Axumite presence in Amhara dates back to at least the 9th century AD, when the Istifanos monastery was erected on Lake Hayq. Several other sites and monuments indicate the presence of similar Axumite influences in the area, such as the Geta Lion statues, which are located 10 km south of Kombolcha, and they are believed to date back to the 3rd century AD, or they may even date back to pre-Axumite times.

In 1998, ancient pieces of pottery were found around tombs in Atatiya in Southern Wollo, in Habru which is located to the south-east of Hayq, as well as to the north-east of Ancharo (Chiqa Beret). The decorations and symbols which are inscribed on the pottery substantiate the expansion of Aksumite civilization to the south of Angot.

According to Karl Butzer "By 800, Axum had almost ceased to exist, and its demographic resources were barely adequate  to stop the once tributary pastoralists of the border marches from pillaging the defenseless countryside." With some of the common people the Axumite elite abandoned Axum in favor of central Ethiopia. Christian families gradually migrated southward into Amhara and northern Shewa. Population movement from the old provinces in the north into more fertile areas in the south seems to have been connected to the southward shift of the kingdom.

The Amhara people are considered heirs of the Aksumsite Empire. They have preserved the oral and written cultural and religious traditions of the Ethiopian Empire.

The Amhara nobles supported the Zagwe dynasty prince Lalibela in his power struggle against his brothers which led him to make Amharic Lessana Negus as well as fill the Amhara nobles in the top positions of his Kingdom.

Solomonic Dynasty 

Yekuno Amlak, a prince from Bete Amhara (lit: House of Amhara) claimed descent from Solomon, and established the Solomonic Dynasty in 1270 AD. Yekuno's rule was legitimatized by the Ethiopian Church, after he defeated the last ruler of the Zagwe dynasty at the Battle of Ansata. The Solomonic dynasty governed the Ethiopian Empire for many centuries from 1270 AD onwards up until the deposing of Haile Selassie in 1974. The Amhara continuously ruled and formed the political core of the Ethiopian Empire, expanding its borders, its wealth and its international prestige, establishing several medieval royal sites and capitals such as Tegulet, Debre Berhan, Barara (located on Mount Entoto, in modern-day Addis Ababa), Gonder, and Magdala.

The Amhara gained political dominance in the Horn of Africa through Amda Seyon's conquests of Muslim borderlands, which greatly expanded Ethiopian territory and power in the region that would be maintained for centuries after his death. Amda Seyon asserted the strength of the new Solomonic dynasty and therefore legitimized it. These expansions further provided for the spread of Christianity to frontier areas, sparking a long era of  Christianization, Amharaization, and integration of previously Islamic areas.

Beginning in the reign of Wedem Arad, and increasing during the early 15th century, the Emperors sought to make diplomatic contact with European kingdoms for the first time since the Aksumite period. A letter from King Henry IV of England to the Emperor of Abyssinia survives. In 1428, Emperor Yeshaq sent two emissaries to Alfonso V of Aragon, who sent return emissaries who failed to complete the return trip.

The first continuous relationship with a European country began in 1508 with Portugal under Emperor Lebna Dengel, who had just inherited the throne from his father. This proved to be an important development, for when the Empire was subjected to the attacks of the Ottoman Empire aligned Adal Sultanate, Portugal assisted the Ethiopian emperor in the Ethiopian–Adal War by sending weapons and 400 men, who helped his son Gelawdewos defeat Ahmad and re-establish his rule.

The Amhara contributed numerous rulers over the centuries, including Haile Selassie, whose father was both paternally and maternally Amhara of Solomonic descent.

Social stratification

Within traditional Amharic society and that of other local Afro-Asiatic-speaking populations, there were four basic strata. According to the Donald Levine, these consisted of high-ranking clans, low-ranking clans, caste groups (artisans), and slaves. Slaves or rather servants were at the bottom of the hierarchy, and were primarily drawn from the pagan Nilotic Shanqella and Oromo peoples.

Also known as the barya (meaning "slave" in Amharic), they were captured during slave raids in Ethiopia's southern hinterland. War captives were another source of slaves, but the perception, treatment and duties of these prisoners was markedly different. According to Levine, the widespread slavery in Greater Ethiopia formally ended in the 1930s, but former slaves, their offspring, and de facto slaves continued to hold similar positions in the social hierarchy.

The separate Amhara caste system of people ranked higher than slaves was based on the following concepts: (1) endogamy, (2) hierarchical status, (3) restraints on commensality, (4) pollution concepts, (5) traditional occupation, and (6) inherited caste membership. Scholars accept that there has been a rigid, endogamous and occupationally closed social stratification among the Amharas and other Afro-Asiatic-speaking Ethiopian ethnic groups. Some label it as an economically closed, endogamous class system with occupational minorities, whereas others such as David Todd assert that this system can be unequivocally labelled as caste-based.

Language

The Amhara speak "Amharic"("Amarigna", "Amarinya") as their mother tongue. Its native speakers account for 29.3% of the Ethiopian population. It belongs to the Semitic branch of the Afro-Asiatic language family, and is the largest member of the Ethiopian Semitic group. As of 2018 it had more than 57 million speakers worldwide (32,345,260 native speakers plus 25,100,000 second language speakers), making it the most commonly-spoken language in Ethiopia in terms of first- and second-language speakers, and the second most spoken Semitic language after Arabic.

Most of the Ethiopian Jewish communities in Ethiopia and Israel speak Amharic. Many followers of the Rastafari movement learn Amharic as a second language, as they consider it to be a sacred language.

Amharic is the working language of the federal authorities of the Ethiopian government, and one of the five official languages of Ethiopia. It was for some time also the sole language of primary school instruction, but has been replaced in many areas by regional languages such as Oromo and Tigrinya. Nevertheless, Amharic is still widely used as the working language of Amhara Region, Benishangul-Gumuz Region, Gambela Region and Southern Nations, Nationalities, and Peoples' Region. The Amharic language is transcribed using a script (Fidal) which is slightly modified from the Ethiopic or Ge'ez script, an abugida.

Religion

For centuries, the predominant religion of the Amhara has been Christianity, with the Ethiopian Orthodox Tewahedo Church playing a central role in the culture of the country. According to the 2007 census, 82.5% of the population of the Amhara Region was Ethiopian Orthodox; 17.2% of it was Muslim, 0.2% of it was Protestant (see P'ent'ay) and 0.5% of it was Jewish (see Beta Israel).

The Ethiopian Orthodox Church maintains close links with the Coptic Orthodox Church of Alexandria. Easter and Epiphany are the most important celebrations, marked with services, feasting and dancing. There are also many feast days throughout the year, when only vegetables or fish may be eaten.
 
Marriages are often arranged, with men marrying in their late teens or early twenties. Traditionally, girls were married as young as 14, but in the 20th century, the minimum age was raised to 18, and this was enforced by the Imperial government. After a church wedding, divorce is frowned upon. Each family hosts a separate wedding feast after the wedding.

Upon childbirth, a priest will visit the family to bless the infant. The mother and child remain in the house for 40 days after birth for physical and emotional strength. The infant will be taken to the church for baptism at 40 days (for boys) or 80 days (for girls).

Culture

Literature 

Surviving Amharic literary works dates back to the 14th century, when songs and poems were composed. In the 17th century Amharic became the first African language to be translated into Latin when Ethiopian priest and lexicographer Abba Gorgoryos (1595–1658) in 1652 AD made a European voyage to Thuringia in Germany. Gorgoryos along with his colleague and friend Hiob Ludolf co-authored the earliest grammar book of the Amharic language, an Amharic-Latin dictionary, as well as contributing to Ludolf's book "A History of Ethiopia".

Modern literature in Amharic however, started two centuries later than in Europe, with the Amharic fiction novel Ləbb Wälläd Tarik, published in Rome in 1908, and widely considered the first novel in Amharic, by Afäwarq Gäbrä Iyäsus. Since then countless literature in Amharic has been published and many modern-day writers in Amharic translate their work into English for commercial reasons.

Music 

Up until the mid 20th century, Amharic music consisted mainly of religious and secular folk songs and dances. 
Qañat Amhara secular folk music developed in the countryside through the use of traditionel instruments such as the :masenqo, a one-string bowed :lute; the :krar, a six-string :lyre; and the washint flute played by the local village musicians called the Azmaris, and the peasantry dancing the Eskista; the most well known Amharan folk dance. 
The :begena, a large ten-string lyre; is an important instrument solely devoted to the spiritual part of Amhara music. Other instruments includes the Meleket wind instrument, and the Kebero and Negarit drums.

From the 1950s onward foreign influence i.e. foreign educated Ethiopians and the availability of larger quantities of new instruments led to new genre's of Amharic music and ushered in the 1960s and 1970s Golden Age of Ethiopian music. The popular Ethio-Jazz genre pioneered by Mulatu Astatke was created from the Tizita qañat of the Amhara combined with the use of Western instruments. Saxophone legend Getatchew Mekurya instrumentalized the Amhara war cry Shellela into an genre in the 1950s before joining the Ethio-Jazz scene later in his career. Other Amharic artists from the Golden age such as Asnaketch Worku, Bahru Kegne, Kassa Tessema and Mary Armede were renowned for their mastery of traditionel instruments.

The political turmoil during the Derg regime (1974-1991) led to censorship of music; night life came to a standstill through government imposed curfews and the curbing of musical performances. Notable Ethiopian musicians were jailed including those of Amhara descent such as Ayalew Mesfin and Telela Kebede. A revival of Qene; Amharic poetic songs which uses double entendre known as sam-enna warq (wax and gold) was used for subversive dialogue and resistance to state censorship. Thousands of Ethiopians including musicians migrated during this period to form communities in different countries.

Amharic songs of resistance against the autocratic EPRDF regime led by the TPLF (1991-2018) continued; with prevailing themes being rampant corruption, economic favoritism, excessive emphasis on ethnic identity and its ability to undermine national unity. Amharic musicians; such as Getish Mamo, Nhatty Man, Teddy Afro and others turned to the old tradition of sam-enna warq and used layered expression to evade skirt stringent censorship and oppressive laws (such as the anti-terror law) while reminding the people of their similarities and the importance of maintaining solidarity.

In June 2022 Teddy Afro bashed Abiy Ahmed and his regime in a critical new song (Na'et), following the Gimbi massacre. In his song he tries to vent the suppressed public anger and indignation, the swelling public resentment to the chaos in the country.

Art

Amhara art is typified by religious paintings. One of the notable features of these is the large eyes of the subjects, who are usually biblical figures. It is usually oil on canvas or hide, some surviving from the Middle Ages. The Amhara art includes weaved products embellished with embroidery. Works in gold and silver exist in the form of filigree jewelry and religious emblems.

Kinship and marriage
The Amhara culture recognizes kinship, but unlike other ethnic groups in the Horn of Africa region, it has a lesser role. Household relationships are primary, and the major economic, political and cultural functions are not based on kin relationships among the Amharas. Rather abilities of the individual matter. For example, states Donald Levine, the influence of clergy among the Amhara has been based on "ritual purity, doctrinal knowledge, ability to perform miracles and capacity to provide moral guidance". The social relationships in the Amhara culture are predominantly based on hierarchical patterns and individualistic associations.

Family and kin relatives are often involved in arranging semanya (eighty bond marriage, also called kal kidan), which has been most common and allows divorce. Other forms of marriage include qurban, which is solemnized in church, where divorce is forbidden, and usually observed among the orthodox priests. Patrilineal descent is the norm. While the wife had no inheritance rights, in case a child was conceived during the temporary damoz marriage, the child could make a claim a part of the father's property.

Cuisine

Amhara cuisine consists of various vegetable or spicy meat side dishes and entrées, usually a wat, or thick stew, served atop injera, a large sourdough flatbread made of teff flour in the shape of pancakes usually of about 30 to 45 cm in diameter. When eating traditional injera dishes in groups, it's normally it eaten from a mesob (shared food basket), with each person breaking off pieces of injera flatbread using only the right hand, from the side nearest them and dipping it into stew in the center of the basket. There is also a great variety of vegetarian stews such as lentils, ground split peas, grains, accompanied by injera and/or bread.

Amharas adhering to any of the Abrahmic religions do not eat pork or shellfish of any kind for religious reasons. Amhara Orthodox Christians do not consume meat and dairy products (i.e. egg, butter, milk, and cheese) during specific fasting periods, and on every Wednesdays and Fridays except the 50 days between Easter and Pentecost. On all other days meat and dairy products are allowed. A variety of vegan dishes are consumed during fasting periods.

Ethiopia is a Buna (coffee) exporter, but also has a very large domestic consumer base. During social gatherings Amharas drink Buna in a unique and traditional way known as a coffee ceremony.  First the coffee is roasted, then ground and placed in a Jebena (coffee pot) with boiling water. When ready it is then served to people in little cups, up to three times per ceremony.

The ceremony is typically performed by the woman of the household, or the female host and is considered an honor. Amhara women dress up for the occasion in a kemis, a traditional dress. Other locally produced beverages are tella (beer) and tej (honey wine), which are served and drunk on major religious festivals, Saints Days and weddings.

Nature of Amhara ethnicity
Mackonen Michael (2008) noted that the Amhara identity is claimed to be composed of multiple ethnicities by some, whereas others "reject this concept and argue that Amhara exists as a distinctive ethnic group with a specific located boundary". He further noted that "although people from the Ethiopian highland areas think of themselves as Amharas, the Northern Shoans specifically call themselves Amhara. That is why the Oromo and Tigrian discourse associate the Northern Shoans as oppressive‐Amharas."

According to Gideon P. E. Cohen, writing in 2000, there is some debate about "whether the Amhara can legitimately be regarded as an ethnic group, [...] given their distribution throughout Ethiopia, and the incorporative capacity of the group that has led to the inclusion of individuals from a wide range of ethnic or linguistic backgrounds". Similarly, Tezera Tazebew notes that "the early 1990s was marked by debates, both popular and scholarly, on the (non-)existence of Amhara as a distinct ethnic group", giving the debate between the academic Mesfin Woldemariam and president of the Transitional Government of Ethiopia Meles Zenawi in July 1991 as an example.

Due to large amounts of assimilation into the northern Amhara culture after Ethiopian imperial expansion, Siegfried Pausewang concluded in 2005 that "the term Amhara relates in contemporary Ethiopia to two different and distinct social groups. The ethnic group of the Amhara, mostly a peasant population, is  different from a mixed group of urban people coming from different ethnic background, who have adopted Amharic as a common language and identify themselves as Ethiopians".

In a 2017 article, historian Brian J. Yates notes that some "scholars and politicians have attempted to sketch out what an Amhara is, but there are considerable divergences on the nature of this identity. Some argue that it is a cultural identity; however, much of the scholarship indicates that it is solely a class-based identity, devoid of ethnicity".

Solomon Gashaw asserts that "there is no intra-Amhara ethnic consciousness, except among northern settlers in southern Ethiopia". He notes that most Amharic-speaking people identify by their place of birth. He asks, "what is Amhara domination?", answering: "It is a linguistic and cultural domination by a multi-ethnic group who speak Amharic".

Writing in 1998, Tegegne Teka wrote that "the Amhara do not possess what people usually refer to as objective ethnic markers: common ancestry, territory, religion and shared experience except the language. The Amhara have no claims to a common ancestry. They do not share the same sentiments and they have no mutual interests based on shared understandings. It is, therefore, difficult to conclude that the Amhara belong to an ethnic group. But this does not mean that there is no Amhara identity".

According to ethnographer Donald Levine, writing in 2003 and citing Christopher Clapham, "Only in the last quarter of the 20th cent. has the term [Amhara] come to be a common ethnic appellation, comparable to the way in which Oromo has become generalized
to cover peoples who long knew themselves primarily as Boorana (Boräna), Guğği, Mäč̣č̣a and the like. Even so, Amharic-speaking Šäwans still feel themselves closer to non-Amharic-speaking Šäwans than to Amharic-speakers from distant regions like Gondär and there are few members of the Šäwan nobility who do not have Oromo genealogical links". According to Takkele Taddese, Amharic-speakers tend to be a "supra-ethnic group" composed of "fused stock". Taddese describes the Amhara as follows:

The Amhara can thus be said to exist in the sense of being a fused stock, a supra-ethnically conscious ethnic Ethiopian serving as the pot in which all the other ethnic groups are supposed to melt. The language, Amharic, serves as the center of this melting process although it is difficult to conceive of a language without the existence of a corresponding distinct ethnic group speaking it as a mother tongue. The Amhara does not exist, however, in the sense of being a distinct ethnic group promoting its own interests and advancing the Herrenvolk philosophy and ideology as has been presented by the elite politicians. The basic principle of those who affirm the existence of the Amhara as a distinct ethnic group, therefore, is that the Amhara should be dislodged from the position of supremacy and each ethnic group should be freed from Amhara domination to have equal status with everybody else. This sense of Amhara existence can be viewed as a myth.

Ethnic consciousness in the past
In the 17th century, Abyssinian traveler Abba Gorgoryos states the following in a letter to his German friend Hiob Ludolf:
As to my origins, do not imagine, my friend, that they are humble, for I am of the House of Amhara which is a respected tribe; from it come the heads of the Ethiopian people, the governors, the military commanders, the judges and the advisers of the King of Ethiopia who appoint and dismiss, command and rule in the name of the King, his governors, and grandees. "

The rise of ethnic consciousness and nationalism 
Zola Moges notes the emergence of Amhara nationalism and ethnic consciousness with origins in the early 1990s but taking clearer shape with the establishment of the National Movement of Amhara in 2018. Moges writes that a "younger generation has adopted its 'Amharaness'; but most ordinary people are yet to fully embrace it, not least because of the lack of any effectively articulated ideological foundation or priorities and the absence of any 'tailor-made' solutions to the challenges facing them".

Amanuel Tesfaye writes that: "While the older Amhara population still detest ethnic identification and ethnic forms of political organization, preferring pan-Ethiopian nationalism, the young have no problem pronouncing their Amhara identity, advocating for the protection and advancement of the rights and interests of their ethnic kin within the framework of the multi-nation state, and organizing politically along that particular ethnic identity".

Notable Amharas

Aba Gorgorios, Catholic priest 
Abebe Aregai, Prime Minister
Abebe Bikila, Olympic athlete, gold medalist
Abuna Basilios, First Patriarch of the Ethiopian Orthodox Tewahido Church
Abuna Theophilos, Second Patriarch of the Ethiopian Orthodox Tewahido Church
Abune Petros, patriot
Afevork Ghevre Jesus, Ethiopian writer
Afewerk Tekle, Honorable Laureate Maitre Artiste 
Aklilu Habte-Wold, Prime Minister
Alemayehu Eshete, Ethiopian singer
Alemu Aga, musician, singer, and master of the Begena
Amanuel Gebremichael
Amda Seyon I, Emperor of the Ethiopian Empire
Andualem Aragie, Vice President and Press Secretary for the Ethiopian-based Unity for Democracy and Justice
Asnaketch Worku, Ethiopian singer
Asrat Woldeyes, Surgeon
Aster Aweke, Ethiopian singer 
Berhaneyesus Demerew Souraphiel, Ethiopian Catholic cardinal, Head of the Ethiopian Catholic Church. 
Baeda Maryam I, Emperor of the Ethiopian Empire
Bakaffa, Emperor of the Ethiopian Empire
Belay Zeleke, patriot
Dawit I, Emperor of the Ethiopian Empire
Dawit II, Emperor of the Ethiopian Empire
Dawit III, Emperor of the Ethiopian Empire
Ejigayehu Shibabaw, better known as Gigi, Ethiopian singer 
Eleni Gebre-Medhin, prominent female Ethiopian economist. 
Emahoy Tsegué-Maryam Guèbrou, Ethiopian nun known for her piano playing and compositions
Eskender, Emperor of the Ethiopian Empire
Fasilides, Emperor of the Ethiopian Empire
Gebre Hanna, dabtara renowned in Amharic oral tradition
Gedion Zelalem
Gelawdewos, Emperor of the Ethiopian Empire
Gelila Bekele, International model
Getatchew Haile, philologist
Getatchew Mekurya, Legendary Ethiopian Jazz Saxophonist 
Haddis Alemayehu, Foreign Minister and Novelist
Haile Gebrselassie, renowned world Athlete
Haile Gerima, Award-winning writer, producer & director.
Haile Selassie, Emperor of the Ethiopian Empire
Heruy Wolde Selassie, Foreign Minister 
Iyasu I, Emperor of the Ethiopian Empire
Iyasu II, Emperor of the Ethiopian Empire
Kebede Michael, Ethiopian writer
Liya Kebede, International supermodel 
Makonnen Wolde Mikael, Military officer, diplomat, court official
Makonnen Endelkachew, Prime Minister
Menas of Ethiopia, Emperor of the Ethiopian Empire
Menelik II, Emperor of the Ethiopian Empire 
Menen Asfaw, Empress of Ethiopia, reign between 2 November 1930 – 15 February 1962
Mesfin Woldemariam, author, Sakharov prize winning human rights activist and politician. 
Mulatu Astatke, musician, father of Ethio-jazz
Muluken Melesse, Music Artist
Na'od, Emperor of the Ethiopian Empire
Newaya Krestos, Emperor of the Ethiopian Empire
Newaya Maryam, Emperor of the Ethiopian Empire
Sarsa Dengel, Emperor of the Ethiopian Empire
Seifu Mikael, diplomat, governor 
Simegnew Bekele,Chief Project Manager of the GERD
Susenyos I, Emperor of the Ethiopian Empire
Tekle Hawariat Tekle Mariyam, pioneer of Ethiopian and African theater
Telela Kebede, Ethiopian singer
Temesgen Tiruneh Director general of National Intelligence and Security Service
Tewodros II, Emperor of the Ethiopian Empire
The Weeknd, Ethiopian-Canadian R&B artist
Wolde Giorgis Wolde Yohannes, Minister of the pen
Workneh Eshete, surgeon and diplomat
Yaqob, Emperor of the Ethiopian Empire
Yekuno Amlak, founder of the Solomonic Dynasty
Yeshaq I, Emperor of the Ethiopian Empire 
Yetnebersh Nigussie, is a renowned lawyer and disability rights activist from Amhara Saint, Bete-Amhara (Wello now), Amhara regional state, Ethiopia.
Yidnekatchew Tessema, 4th President of CAF
Zara Yaqob, Emperor of the Ethiopian Empire

See also
Amhara genocide
Amhara Region coup d'état attempt
Fano
Habesha people
History of Ethiopia

References

Further reading
 Wolf Leslau and Thomas L. Kane (collected and edited), Amharic Cultural Reader. Wiesbaden: Harrassowitz 2001. .
 Donald N. Levine, Wax & Gold: Tradition and Innovation in Ethiopian Culture (Chicago: University Press, 1972)

External links

 Lemma, Marcos (MD, PhD). 
People of Africa, Amhara Culture and History

Habesha peoples
Ethnic groups in Ethiopia